Leroy Evans "Chick" Maynard (November 2, 1896 – January 31, 1957) was a shortstop in Major League Baseball who played briefly for the Boston Red Sox during the  season. Listed at 5' 9", 150 lb., Maynard batted left-handed and threw right-handed. A native of Turners Falls, Massachusetts, he studied at Dartmouth College.

In a 12-game career, Maynard was a .125 hitter (3-for-24) with one run scored without any home runs. At shortstop, he committed five errors in 39 chances for a .872 fielding percentage.

Maynard died in Bangor, Maine at age 60.

External links

Retrosheet

1896 births
1957 deaths
Baseball players from Massachusetts
Major League Baseball shortstops
Boston Red Sox players
Dartmouth College alumni